KhK Urozhay is a bandy club in Smidovich, Russia. The club was playing in the Russian Bandy Supreme League, the second tier of Russian bandy, until the 2015-16 season. The home games were played at Lokomotiv Stadium in Smidovich. The club colours are yellow and blue.

References

Bandy clubs in Russia
Bandy clubs in the Soviet Union
Sport in the Jewish Autonomous Oblast
Bandy clubs established in 1960
1960 establishments in Russia